The Caribbean Netherlands Science Institute, also known as CNSI, is a scientific research facility in the Caribbean Netherlands, specifically on the island of Sint Eustatius. CNSI was officially opened in 2014. It was created by NIOZ (the Royal Netherlands Institute of Sea Research, aka Nederlands Instituut voor Zeeonderzoek) and is also closely allied with the Faculty of Archaeology of Leiden University, IMARES Wageningen UR, Naturalis Biodiversity Centre, and the Royal Netherlands Institute of Southeast Asian and Caribbean Studies.

References

External links
Official CNSI−Caribbean Netherlands Science Institute website—

Scientific organizations
Caribbean studies
Oranjestad, Sint Eustatius
Organisations based in Sint Eustatius
Scientific organisations based in the Netherlands
Scientific organizations established in 2014
2014 establishments in the Netherlands
2010s establishments in the Caribbean